Peredurus is a legendary king of the Britons in Geoffrey of Monmouth's pseudohistorical chronicle Historia Regum Britanniae. According to Geoffrey, he was the youngest son of King Morvidus and brother of Gorbonianus, Archgallo, Elidurus, and Ingenius.

Following the return of Elidurus to the kingship of Britain, Peredurus joined with his brother Ingenius and attacked their older brother.  They succeeded in capturing him and locked him in a guarded tower in Trinovantum.  Instead of fighting over who ruled the island, they split the island giving Cornwall to Ingenius and Albany to Peredurus.  He ruled his portion of the island for seven years then Ingenius died and he was awarded with the entire kingdom.  He ruled moderately and was considered better than his brothers before him.  Few remembered Elidurus locked in the tower until death finally took Peredurus.  Elidurus returned once more as king following Peredurus's death. His son Runo later became king of Britain.

See also
Peredur

3rd-century BC rulers
Legendary British kings